The 2008 Superstars Series season was the fifth season of the Campionato Italiano Superstars (Italian Superstars Championship) and the second season of the International Superstars Series.
The Italian championship was won by Gianni Morbidelli driving for Audi, while the international series was won by Stefano Gabellini driving for BMW.

Teams and drivers 

 Audi Sport Italia and its drivers entered only the Italian Championship; nevertheless Steven Goldstein entered also the International Series from the third round.

Calendar

Scoring system

Results

Championship standings

Campionato Italiano Superstars

International Superstars Series – Drivers

International Superstars Series – Teams

References

External links 
 Official Superstars website

Superstars Series
Superstars Series seasons